PPHU Ekolot is a Polish aircraft manufacturer based in Korczyna, Podkarpackie Voivodeship, with its factory in Krosno. The company was formed in 1995 and its director is Henryk Słowik.

The company specializes in the design and manufacture of ultralight aircraft in the form of kits for amateur construction and ready-to-fly aircraft for the Fédération Aéronautique Internationale microlight and the American light-sport aircraft categories.

Working in composite materials, the company produces the Jerzy Krawczyk-designed Ekolot JK 01A Elf motorglider and two ultralight aircraft, the strut-braced Ekolot JK-05L Junior and the cantilever-wing Ekolot KR-030 Topaz. The Topaz has been accepted by the US Federal Aviation Administration as a light-sport aircraft.

Aircraft

References

External links

Aircraft manufacturers of Poland
Ultralight aircraft
Homebuilt aircraft
Polish brands